70 series may refer to:

Transport

Cars
 Cadillac Series 70
 Oldsmobile Series 70

Japanese train types
 Osaka Municipal Subway 70 series electric multiple unit
 TWR 70-000 series electric multiple unit

Computing
 UNIVAC Series 70, mainframe computers